Bašigovačko Lake (Bašigovačko jezero) is a lake in the municipality of Živinice, eastern Bosnia and Herzegovina.

References

Lakes of Bosnia and Herzegovina